Cape Vestkapp is a prominent westward projection of the ice front of the Riiser-Larsen Ice Shelf located midway along the ice front and about 60 nautical miles (110 km) west of the Kraul Mountains, Queen Maud Land. It was first photographed from the air by Norwegian-British-Swedish Antarctic Expedition (NBSAE) in 1951-52 and mapped from these photos. It was named Vestkapp (meaning "west cape") by Norway.

Headlands of Queen Maud Land
Princess Martha Coast